"Serenade" is a song with music by Sigmund Romberg and lyrics by Dorothy Donnelly from the first act of their operetta The Student Prince

In the 1954 MGM film The Student Prince, it was sung by Mario Lanza.

Track listing

Charts

References 

1924 songs
1954 singles
RCA Victor singles
His Master's Voice singles
Mario Lanza songs
Arias
Songs from musicals